Pyttipanna (Swedish), pyttipanne (Norwegian), pyttipannu (Finnish) or biksemad (Danish), is a culinary dish consisting of chopped meat, potatoes and onions fried in a pan, similar to a hash. The term is compound Swedish for roughly "small pieces in pan", but it can also be found styled as separate words: pytt i panna (Norwegian: pytt-i-panne). The prefix pytt is a shortened form of "pytte", a word prefix indicating smallness, roughly translatable to "puny" in english ("puny in pan"). The Danish term means "mixed food". It is a popular dish in Sweden, Norway, Finland and Denmark.

Traditionally consisting of potatoes, onions, and any kind of chopped or minced meat such as sausage, ham or meatballs, diced and then pan fried, it is often served with a fried egg, pickled beetroot slices, sour pickled gherkin slices, capers and sometimes ketchup or brown sauce. An alternative version of the dish stirs in cream after frying, much like a gravy, turning it into "cream stewed pyttipanna".

The dish was originally made from leftovers of past meals but now it is also common to prepare pytt i panna from prime ingredients. Frozen pyttipanna of many varieties can be bought in almost every Swedish, Danish, Norwegian and Finnish supermarket. Many variants of the dish exist, including vegetarian and vegan dishes.

Pytt i panna is often abbreviated to pytt, especially when referring to variants such as oxpytt (pytt i panna made with beef) or krögarpytt ("inn master's pytt", made with more finely diced potatoes and beef).

Similar dishes 
 Potatoes O'Brien, from the United States

References

External links 
Pytt i panna recipe at Cookipedia
English-language recipe on Radio Sweden website

Danish cuisine
Finnish cuisine
Norwegian cuisine
Swedish cuisine
Meat and potatoes dishes
Ground meat